Vesper means evening in Classical Latin. It may also refer to:

Places
 Vesper, Kansas, an unincorporated community in the United States
 Vesper, Oregon, an unincorporated community in the United States
 Vesper, Wisconsin, a village in the United States
 Vesper, an abandoned village southwest of Swift Current, Saskatchewan, Canada
 Vesper Peak, a mountain in Washington State, United States

People
 Heike Vesper (born 1970), German marine biologist
 Iulian Vesper (1908–1986), Romanian writer
 Rose Vesper, member of the Ohio House of Representatives (1993–2000)
 Rudolf Vesper (born 1939), East German Olympic gold medalist in Greco-Roman wrestling
 Will Vesper (1882–1962), German author and literary critic

Arts, entertainment, and media
 Vesper (novel), a young-adult novel by Jeff Sampson
 Vesper (film), a 2022 science-fiction movie by Kristina Buožytė and Bruno Samper
 Vesper, an organization in the manga and anime series Mahoromatic
 Vesper, a banshee with unusually magical singing abilities from animated television series Mysticons
 Vesper Family, a family in the book series The 39 Clues
 Vesper Holly, a character from a book series by Lloyd Alexander
 Vesper Lynd, a character in the James Bond novel and film Casino Royale
 Vesper, a village in the Ultima series of video games

Organizations
 Vesper Boat Club, an amateur rowing club in Philadelphia, Pennsylvania,  United States
 Vesper Country Club, one of the first golf courses in the United States

Science
 Vesper bat, the largest, best-known family of bats
 Vesper mouse, a rodent genus
 Vesper sparrow, a medium-sized bird
 Vesper (plant), a genus of plants in the family Apiaceae
 Vesper mission, a planned Venus chemistry and dynamics orbiter of the NASA Discovery Program

Other uses
 Vesper (cocktail), an alcoholic beverage recipe popularized by Ian Fleming
 The Roman equivalent of Hesperus, the Greek name given to the planet Venus at sunset
 Hesperus, the personification of the evening star Vesper in Greek mythology
 , a British destroyer in commission in the Royal Navy from 1918 to the 1920s and from 1939 to 1945

See also
 Vespa
 Vespers (disambiguation)
 VSEPR theory in chemistry, often pronounced "Vesper"